January Suchodolski (September 19, 1797 – March 20, 1875) was a Polish painter and Army officer, and a member of the Imperial Academy of Arts.

Life

Suchodolski was born in Grodno and was the brother of Rajnold Suchodolski. He joined the Warsaw Cadet Corps in 1810. In 1812 he stood guard on the Hotel Angielski in Warsaw when Napoleon stayed there incognito, during his escape from Moscow. In 1823 he became adjutant to Wincenty Krasiński a former officer in Napoleon's Army who at the time was with the Royal Regiment of Grenadier Guards. Through Krasiński's connections he got access to the Palace's art galleries, gaining exposure to military paintings particularly those of Horace Vernet. He also gained access to Poland's leading artistic and intellectual circles meeting Julian Ursyn Niemcewicz, Woronicz, Koźmian, Franciszek Salezy Dmochowski, Antoni Edward Odyniec, and Morawski. During this period he started painting pictures with military themes, particularly battles from the Kościuszko Uprising and the Napoleonic wars including those in which Krasiński was involved in during the Peninsular War. He got to know Antoni Brodowski and succeeded in an art competition with compositions called "Taking the banner of Muhammad in Vienna" and "Death of Ladislaus of Varna".

In 1830 Suchodolski and his brother Rajnold took part in the November Uprising. January fought at the First Battle of Wawer, the Battle of Olszynka Grochowska and the Battle of Iganie. In his spare time he sketched the scenes of soldiers and made portraits of his colleagues.

Following the defeat of the uprising — in which his brother Rajnold died — January went to Rome where he became a pupil of Horace Vernet from 1832 to 1837. Here he socialised with Zygmunt Krasiński, Wincenty's son, Juliusz Słowacki, Thorwaldsen, Johann Friedrich Overbeck, Peter von Cornelius, and Louis Léopold Robert. He returned to Warsaw in 1837 and was soon offered membership of the Imperial Academy of Fine Arts for his painting "Siege of Akhaltsikhe". He was then invited to St Petersburg by Tsar 
Nicholas I  to paint famous battles of the Russian Army. After returning to Poland, he next went to Paris in 1844. In 1852 he moved to Kraków, where he met Wincenty Pol. He provided some illustrations for Pol's poem 'Mohorta'. In 1860 Suchodolski joined the committee of the Society for the Encouragement of Fine Arts and helped set up the Museum of Fine Arts in Warsaw.

January Suchodolski died in Bojmie (near Siedlce) on March 20, 1875.

Gallery

See also
List of Polish artists

References

Further reading

K. Sroczyńska, January Suchodolski, Warszawa 1984

1797 births
1875 deaths
People from Grodno
Polish Army officers
19th-century Polish painters
19th-century Polish male artists
19th-century war artists
November Uprising participants
Polish war artists
Polish male painters